The Schizosaccharomycetaceae are a family of yeasts in the order Schizosaccharomycetales.

References

Yeasts
Ascomycota
Ascomycota families